The men's 10,000 metres in speed skating at the 1994 Winter Olympics took place on 20 February, at the Hamar Olympic Hall. 16 competitors from 10 nations participated in the event.

Records
Prior to this competition, the existing world and Olympic records were as follows:

The following new world record was set during this competition.

Results

References

Men's speed skating at the 1994 Winter Olympics